Beutin is a commune in the Pas-de-Calais department in the Hauts-de-France region in northern France.

Geography
A small village situated some 4 miles(6 km) northwest of Montreuil-sur-Mer, on the N39 road, by the banks of the Canche river.

Population

See also
Communes of the Pas-de-Calais department

References

Communes of Pas-de-Calais